Spring Meadow Lake State Park is a public recreation area covering  just west of Helena, Montana. Once the site of a gravel pit and factory, the state park centers around a man-made, spring-fed lake, which is used for swimming, fishing, non-motorized boating, and scuba diving. The park also offers picnicking, a mile-long trail around the lake, and ice fishing and ice skating in winter. Largemouth bass, westslope cutthroat trout, yellow perch, and pumpkinseed are the main catches. A fishing pier was added to  lake in 2011.

References

External links
Spring Meadow Lake State Park Montana Fish, Wildlife & Parks
Spring Meadow Lake State Park Trail Map Montana Fish, Wildlife & Parks

Protected areas of Lewis and Clark County, Montana
State parks of Montana
Meadows in the United States